The Joliet Bridge, in Carbon County, Montana, near Joliet, is a Pratt through truss bridge built in 1901. It was listed on the National Register of Historic Places in 1986.

It is a multiple-span road bridge. On the south end, there are approach spans made of wood stringers (horizontal timbers) supported by timber pile bents; these replaced an original pony truss approach span. The deck is made of wood bridge planks, covered with asphalt.

It was designed and built by William S. Hewett, a bridge builder based in Minneapolis, who was low bidder on the contract for the main bridge, at $4,500, and also for an approach span, at $750, which had to be added, perhaps because the original measurements or specifications were not adequate.

The bridge carries Main Street road over Rock Creek, south of the town.

See also
List of bridges documented by the Historic American Engineering Record in Montana
List of bridges on the National Register of Historic Places in Montana

References

External links

Road bridges on the National Register of Historic Places in Montana
Pratt truss bridges
Historic American Engineering Record in Montana
National Register of Historic Places in Carbon County, Montana
Bridges completed in 1901
Bridges on the National Register of Historic Places in Montana